Coliseum Books was an independent bookstore that opened in 1974 on the northwest corner of 57th Street and Broadway, near Columbus Circle in the New York City borough of Manhattan. After initially closing in 2002, following a series of financial difficulties and in part due to the increased real estate prices in that part of Manhattan, it relocated to its final location on 11 West 42nd Street near Bryant Park.

In early October 2006 Coliseum's founder and co-owner George Leibson announced that by the end of the year Coliseum Books would once again close permanently. Among the reasons cited for the possible failure of the newest incarnation of Coliseum were an inability to connect with potential book-buyers in its new market, high real estate prices and the decline of independent booksellers within New York City. Coliseum Books' final day of business was  January 6, 2007.

References

External links
Coliseum Books Official website.
Coliseum Books closing again
Coliseum Books To Leave ‘Gaping Cultural Wound'

1974 establishments in New York City
42nd Street (Manhattan)
57th Street (Manhattan)
Bookstores in Manhattan
Broadway (Manhattan)
Bryant Park
Former buildings and structures in Manhattan
Defunct companies based in New York (state)
Defunct retail companies of the United States
Independent bookstores of the United States